Abdul Ameer (born 20 March 1992) is a Pakistani first-class cricketer who plays for Karachi cricket team.

References

External links
 

1992 births
Living people
Pakistani cricketers
Karachi cricketers
Karachi Kings cricketers
Cricketers from Karachi